Bodh may refer to:

 Bodh (poem), a Bengali poem by Jibanananda Das
 Bodh people, a community of Himachal Pradesh, India

People 
 Bodh Singh Bhagat, Indian politician
 Bodh Raj Sawhney, Indian judge

See also 
 Bodh Gaya, a city in Bihar, India
 BOHD, a psychedelic drug
 Baudh State, a princely state of India
 Boudh, a town in Orissa, India
 Bod (disambiguation)